The Edwin O. Reischauer Institute of Japanese Studies (RIJS) at Harvard University is a research center focusing on Japan. It provides a forum for stimulating scholarly and public interest.

The institute's function is to develop and coordinate activities concerning Japan among the various faculties at Harvard.  RIJS responds to scholarly and public interest in Japan from outside Harvard; and RIJS supports outreach activities such as lectures, conferences, symposia, exhibitions and films.

History
In 1973, Edwin Reischauer established the Japan Institute at Harvard. In honor of his 75th birthday in 1985, the Harvard Board of Trustees renamed it The Edwin O. Reischauer Institute of Japanese Studies, to honor Reischauer's contributions to the institute.

Directors
The RIJS Directors are selected from its senior faculty. Through 2019, there have been eleven Institute Directors serving 13 intervals:
 Edwin Reischauer, 1974-1981 
 Donald Shively, 1981-1983 
 Albert M. Craig, 1983-1985 
 Howard Hibbett, 1985-1988 
 Harold Bolitho, 1988-1991 
 Akira Iriye, 1991-1995 
 Helen Hardacre, 1995-1998 
 Andrew Gordon, 1998–2004; 2011-2012
 Susan Pharr, 2002–2003; 2004-2011
 Theodore C. Bestor, 2012–2018
 Mary C. Brinton, 2018–present

Selected works
RIJS's published list of occasional papers on Japanese Studies encompasses 51 works in 83 publications in 1 language and 410 library holdings.

 Multiple Logics of the Welfare State: Skills, Protection, and Female Labor in Japan and Selected OECD countries (1999) by Margarita Estévez-Abe
 Cost Reduction in Transmission and Distribution: a Key Issue for Liberalization of the Power Market (1999) by Shinya Nishigata
 Compliance from Within : MITI's Transition and Japan's Changing GATT Behavior (1999) by Amy Searight
 The Social Responsibility of Corporations (1999) by Masatoshi Taguchi
 Japan's Future Employment System: Recommendations Based on a Study of the Japanese and U.S. Labor Markets (2000) by Koki Hayakawa
 Exploration of Management Methods for Sustainable Development in Regional Governments (2000) by Nobuo Ino
 Style Differences at International Negotiations: a Comparison between Japan and the United States: Case Study of the International Negotiations on Global Climate Change (2000) by Takashi Kageyama
 Toward a More Desirable System of Foreign Exchange Management in Asia: Possible Roles for Japan and the United States (2000) by Yasuhiro Maki
 Reflections on Modern Japanese History in the Context of the Concept of "Genocide" (2001) by Gavan McCormack
 Policy Legacies: Japan's Responses to Domestic and International Environmental Problems (2000) by Isao Miyaoka
 Foreign Direct Investment Strategies of Japanese High-technology Firms in East Asia (2000) by Patricia A Nelson
 The Evolution of Japan's Politico-security Role in the Asia-Pacific Region: an Insider's View (2000) by Seiichiro Otsuka
 Respect for the Elderly's Votes: Theories of Interests and the Elderly in Japanese Healthcare Policy, 1995-2000 (2000) by Paul David Talcott
 Management of Internet Domain Names (2000) by Hidekazu Tanaka
 Rediscovering Women in Tokugawa Japan (2000) by Yutaka Yabuta
 From Feudal Fishing Villagers to an Archipelago's Peoples: the Historiographical Journey of Amino Yoshihiko (2005) by William Johnston

See also
 Edwin O. Reischauer Center for East Asian Studies, Johns Hopkins

Notes

References
 Deptula, Nancy Monteith and Hess, Michael M. (1996) The Edwin O. Reischauer Institute of Japanese Studies: a Twenty-year Chronicle. Cambridge: Harvard University Press. OCLC 041181357

Further reading
 RIJS. (2001) Edwin O. Reischauer Institute of Japanese Studies, Harvard University, 2000-2001 Annual Report.'' OCLC 061741419

External links
RIJS web site

Harvard University
Educational institutions established in 1973
1973 establishments in Massachusetts
Research institutes in Massachusetts
Japanese studies